Nintendo has created many video game series and franchises throughout its history. Their first established series were the Mario and the Donkey Kong series, established in 1981.

The following is a list of lists of characters who appear in various games and franchises published by Nintendo arranged in alphabetical order.

List of Animal Crossing Characters
List of Kirby characters
List of The Legend of Zelda series characters
List of Mario series characters
List of Donkey Kong characters
List of Metroid characters
List of Captain N: The Game Master characters
List of Pokémon characters
List of Pokémon
List of Punch-Out!! boxers
List of Star Fox series characters